Abhayapuri College, situated at Abhayapuri town, is one of the oldest institutions of higher education in lower Assam. The college was established on 13 August 1955. Currently the college has two streams, Science and Arts, and is affiliated to the Gauhati University.

References

External links
   Official Website

Bongaigaon district
Colleges in Assam
Colleges affiliated to Gauhati University
Educational institutions established in 1955
1955 establishments in Assam